Katharine A. Robson Brown is a British anthropologist. She is a professor in Mechanical Engineering and Biological Anthropology at the University of Bristol. She is also the Director of the Jean Golding Institute and Turing University Lead.

Career
Robson Brown joined the faculty at the University of Bristol in 1997 after earning her PhD. She was elected into a Phyllis and Eileen Gibbs Travelling Research Fellowships. In her early years at Briston, she developed the UK's first tomography laboratory within a forensic or physical anthropology department. From 2005 until 2010, Robson Brown was a founding member of the Human Tissue Authority. In 2005, she was a co-Chair of HTA's Import and export working group and Public display working group, as well as a lay member in HTA's Authority.

During the 2011–12 academic term Robson Brown worked alongside geologist Nicholas Minter and biologist Nigel Franks to examine how nest architecture is influenced by factors both social and environmental. The next academic term, Robson Brown earned a University Research Fellowship. The 2015–16 academic year resulted in Robson Brown collaborating with the Radiocarbon Accelerator Unit at the University of Oxford to examine six mortuary chests within Winchester Cathedral. She was later the recipient of Bristol's 2016/17 Engagement Award for her research project Skeletons: Our Buried Bones, in collaboration with Bristol Museums.

She was appointed Director of the Jean Golding Institute in August 2017. With her appointment, Robson Brown earned one of four APEX awards from the Royal Society to research how bones respond to stress. The next year, she was named Turing
University Lead after the Alan Turning Institute joined Bristol. In 2019, Robson Brown and Heidi Dawson-Hobbis found that remains left behind in Winchester Cathedral belonged to 23 Anglo-Saxon kings and queens, rather than 11 people that was originally thought. That year also brought about a collaboration between the Jean Golding Institute and Strathmore University Business School in Kenya. She was also Co-Director of the Human Spaceflight Capitalisation Office in Harwell.

References 

Living people
Alumni of the University of Cambridge
Academics of the University of Bristol
English anthropologists
British women anthropologists
British women academics
Year of birth missing (living people)
20th-century anthropologists
21st-century anthropologists
20th-century British women scientists
21st-century British women scientists